Dissidia Final Fantasy Opera Omnia is a free-to-play role-playing video game set in the Dissidia universe of fighting games. Opera Omnia was published by Final Fantasy franchise owner Square Enix, and was co-developed by Square Enix and Koei Tecmo, who also developed Dissidia Final Fantasy NT, for iOS and Android. Opera Omnia launched on February 1, 2017 in Japan, and was released worldwide on January 30, 2018.

Opera Omnia was met with a mixed critical reception; critics praised its gameplay, but were unhappy with its lack of content.

As of June 8, 2022, Dissidia Final Fantasy Opera Omnia has surpassed 10 million downloads.

Gameplay
Battles in the game are turn-based, with all characters being free. Characters can be enhanced with currency known as crystals, and there are daily login bonuses in the form of gems and summon tickets.

Playable characters
Dissidia Final Fantasy Opera Omnia initially features a total of 25 playable characters upon launch, consisting of both new and returning heroes in the Dissidia Final Fantasy series. More characters were added upon constant patch updates. 

Each character is assigned to one of eleven weapon classes, and is also assigned to one of six crystal colors.

As of March 17, 2023, total numbers of playable characters are 172 and 165 in Japanese server and Global server, respectively.

Note: * = Characters present in JP server only as of now.

Reception 

According to review aggregator Metacritic, Opera Omnia received "mixed to average" reviews. 

Nick Tylwalk of TouchArcade praised the game for not being a "gacha grab" and "generous" with its currency, lauding it as a good example of appropriate fan service.

Christian Colli of Multiplayer.it rated it 8/10 points, praising the combat system as fun and original, but criticizing the game's repetitiveness and lack of an Italian localization.

Harry Slater of Pocket Gamer called Opera Omnia "fairly standard" and said it would be more appealing to dedicated fans of the series.

The Android version has 2 million downloads.

References

External Links 

Opera_Omnia
2018 video games
Fantasy video games
Free-to-play video games
IOS games
Japanese role-playing video games
Koei Tecmo games
Single-player video games